Bismark Storne Ebuka Ubah (born 5 January 1994) is a Nigerian professional footballer who plays as an attacker. Besides Nigeria, he has played in Venezuela and Bolivia.

Career

After joining a professional team at the age of 15, Ubah signed for Tucanes de Amazonas in Venezuela, but eventually left due to the crisis there. From there, he signed for Bolivian side Oriente Petrolero, leaving after a change of head coach.

In 2019, he signed for Deportivo FATIC in the Bolivian lower leagues.

In 2020, he signed for Bolivian top flight outfit Club Atlético Palmaflor. In 2021, he signed for Real Potosí.

References

External links
 Bismark Ubah at playmakerstats.com
 

Living people
1994 births
Nigerian footballers
Nigeria youth international footballers
Association football forwards
Enyimba F.C. players
Oriente Petrolero players
Real Santa Cruz players
C.D. Palmaflor del Trópico players
Bolivian Primera División players
Nigeria Professional Football League players
Nigerian expatriate footballers
Nigerian expatriate sportspeople in Venezuela
Nigerian expatriate sportspeople in Bolivia
Expatriate footballers in Venezuela
Expatriate footballers in Bolivia